The  2020 WGC-FedEx St. Jude Invitational was the 22nd WGC Invitational held July 30 – August 2 at the TPC Southwind in Memphis, Tennessee. Originally planned for July 2–5, it was rescheduled and played with no spectators in attendance due to the COVID-19 pandemic.

FedEx Cup leader Justin Thomas won his second WGC Invitational title, and returned to No. 1 in the Official World Golf Ranking having last held that position in June 2018. Thomas became the third-youngest player to win 13 times on the PGA Tour since 1960, behind Tiger Woods and Jack Nicklaus.

Venue

Course layout 
TPC Southwind was designed by Ron Prichard, in consultation with tour pros Hubert Green and Fuzzy Zoeller. TPC Southwind opened  in 1988, and is a member of the Tournament Players Club network operated by the PGA Tour.

Field 
The field consists of players drawn primarily from the Official World Golf Ranking and the winners of the worldwide tournaments with the strongest fields. In order to ensure a field of 78 players, changes were made to the exemption criteria with the addition of players ranked outside the top-50 in the world rankings. The adjustment was due to the impact of the COVID-19 pandemic.

1. Playing members of the 2019 United States and International Presidents Cup teams.
An Byeong-hun (2), Abraham Ancer (2,3,4), Patrick Cantlay (2,3,4), Bryson DeChambeau (2,3,4,5), Tony Finau (2,3,4), Rickie Fowler (2,3,4), Adam Hadwin, Im Sung-jae (2,3,4,5), Dustin Johnson (2,3,4,5), Matt Kuchar (2,3,4), Marc Leishman (2,3,4,5), Li Haotong, Hideki Matsuyama (2,3,4), Joaquín Niemann (5), Louis Oosthuizen (2,3,4), Pan Cheng-tsung, Patrick Reed (2,3,4,5), Xander Schauffele (2,3,4), Webb Simpson (2,3,4,5), Cameron Smith (2,3,4,5), Justin Thomas (2,3,4,5), Gary Woodland (2,3,4)
Adam Scott (2,3,4,5,6)  and Tiger Woods (2,3,4,5) did not play.

2. The top 50 players from the Official World Golf Ranking as of March 15, 2020 (rankings frozen for 13 weeks).
Christiaan Bezuidenhout (3,4,6), Rafa Cabrera-Bello, Paul Casey (3,4,5), Matt Fitzpatrick (3,4), Tommy Fleetwood (3,4,5), Sergio García (3,4), Tyrrell Hatton (3,4,5), Billy Horschel (3,4), Jazz Janewattananond (3,4,6), Kevin Kisner (3,4), Brooks Koepka (3,4,5), Shane Lowry (3,4), Graeme McDowell (5), Rory McIlroy (3,4,5), Collin Morikawa (3,4,5), Kevin Na (3,4,5), Victor Perez (3,4,5), Jon Rahm (3,4,5), Chez Reavie (3,4), Scottie Scheffler, Brandt Snedeker, Henrik Stenson (3,4), Erik van Rooyen (3,4), Matt Wallace (3,4), Bernd Wiesberger (3,4,5), Danny Willett (3,4,5)
Shugo Imahira (3,4,6), Francesco Molinari (3,4), Justin Rose (3,4), and Lee Westwood (3,4,5) did not play.

3. The top 50 players from the Official World Golf Ranking as of July 20, 2020.
Daniel Berger (4,5), Jason Day (4), Viktor Hovland (4), Ryan Palmer (4), Kevin Streelman (4)

4. The top 50 players from the Official World Golf Ranking as of July 27, 2020.

5. Tournament winners, whose victories are considered official, of tournaments from the Federation Tours since the prior season's WGC Invitational with an Official World Golf Ranking Strength of Field Rating of 115 points or more.'Cameron Champ, Tyler Duncan, Lucas Herbert, Matt Jones, Andrew Landry, J. T. Poston, Sebastian Söderberg, Nick Taylor, Michael Thompson, Brendon Todd

6. The winner of selected tournaments from each of the following tours
 Asian Tour: Indonesian Masters (2019)  – Jazz Janewattananond, also qualified under categories 2, 3 and 4.
 PGA Tour of Australasia: Australian PGA Championship (2019) – Adam Scott, also qualified under categories 1, 2, 3, 4 and 5.
 Japan Golf Tour: Bridgestone Open (2019) – Shugo Imahira, also qualified under categories 2, 3 and 4.
 Japan Golf Tour: Japan Golf Tour Championship (2020) – Cancelled Sunshine Tour: Dimension Data Pro-Am (2020) – Christiaan Bezuidenhout, also qualified under categories 2, 3 and 4.

7. Alternates to fill field to 78 (if necessary) from the Official World Golf Ranking as of July 20, 2020
Ian Poulter (53)
Matthew Wolff (55)
Kang Sung-hoon (58)
Bubba Watson (59)
Jordan Spieth (60)
Corey Conners (63)
Jason Kokrak (66)
Tom Lewis (67)
Joel Dahmen (68)
Shaun Norris (69)
Phil Mickelson (70)
Keegan Bradley (72)
Thomas Pieters (73) – did not playMax Homa (74)
Mackenzie Hughes (75)
Robert MacIntyre (76)

Nationalities in the field

 Round summaries 
 First round Thursday, July 30, 2020With only one top-10 finish since August 2019, defending champion Brooks Koepka tied his career-best score with a 62 to take the first-round lead. Koepka has a reputation of peaking during major season, and the first major of the season is due to be held the following week.

 Second round Friday, July 31, 2020Brendon Todd took a 36-hole lead attempting to gain his third victory this PGA Tour season, two strokes ahead of Rickie Fowler who was also aiming for his first World Golf Championship win.

 Third round Saturday, August 1, 2020Brendon Todd maintained his 36-hole lead. Tom Lewis tied the tournament and course record with a 9-under 61 to move 47 spots up
the leaderboard.

 Final round Sunday, August 2, 2020''

Final leaderboard

Notes

References

External links 
 

 TPC Southwind
 Media Guide

WGC Invitational
WGC-FedEx St. Jude Invitational
WGC-FedEx St. Jude Invitational
WGC-FedEx St. Jude Invitational
WGC-FedEx St. Jude Invitational
WGC-FedEx St. Jude Invitational